"Me Vale" is a song by Spanish singer Miki Núñez. It was released as a single on 8 May 2020 by Universal Music Spain. The song peaked at number 95 on the Spanish Singles Chart. The song was written by Diego Arroyo Bretano, Jaime Summers Blanco and Miguel Núñez Pozo.

Music video
A music video to accompany the release of "Me Vale" was first released onto YouTube on 8 May 2020. Miki Núñez directed the music video during quarantine because of the COVID-19 pandemic. The video centers on himself enjoying life as best as he can in his house, and also features his parents and brother.

Personnel
Credits adapted from Tidal.
 Paco Salazar – Producer, bass guitar, guitar, keyboards, programmer, recording arranger, recording engineer, studio personnel
 Diego Arroyo Bretano – Composer, lyricist, associated performer, recording arranger
 Jaime Summers Blanco – Composer, lyricist, associated performer, guitar, recording arranger
 Miguel Núñez Pozo – Composer, lyricist, associated performer, voice
 Paco Salazar – Associated performer
 Toni Mateos – Associated performer, drums, recording engineer, studio personnel
 Carlos Hernández – Mastering Engineer, studio personnel
 Felipe Guevara – Mixer, studio personnel

Charts

References

2020 songs
2020 singles
Miki Núñez songs
Universal Music Spain singles